Mutsun (also known as San Juan Bautista Costanoan) is a Utian language spoken in Northern California. It was the primary language of a division of the Ohlone people living in the Mission San Juan Bautista area. The Tamien Nation and  band is currently working to restore the use of the language, using a modern alphabet.

Studies of the language
Maria Ascención Solórsano de Garcia y de Cervantes, the last known fluent speaker of Mutsun, amassed large amounts of language and cultural data specific to the Mutsun. The Spanish Franciscan missionary and linguist Felipe Arroyo de la Cuesta wrote extensively about the language's grammar, and linguist John Peabody Harrington made very extensive notes on the language from Solórsano. Harrington's field notes formed the basis of the grammar of Mutsun written by Marc Okrand as a University of California dissertation in 1977, which to this day remains the only grammar ever written of any Costanoan language. Scholars from the U.S., Germany, and the Netherlands have discussed methods that could facilitate the revitalization of Mutsun.

Phonology 
Vowel and consonant phonemes are represented here with the orthography used in the English-Mutsun dictionary, with the orthographic symbol bolded if it differs from IPA transcription.

Vowels 

  is open-mid, whereas  is close-mid.
 Vowels and consonants are doubled to indicate longer pronunciation (ex: IPA for  'knee' is )

Consonants

Alphabet

References 

 Okrand, Marc. 1977. "Mutsun Grammar". Ph.D. dissertation, University of California, Berkeley.
 Ortiz, Beverly R. 1994. Chocheño and Rumsen Narratives: A Comparison. In The Ohlone: Past and Present, pp. 99–164. 

 Teixeira, Lauren S. 1997. The Costanoan/Ohlone Indians of the San Francisco and Monterey Bay Area—A Research Guide. Menlo Park, CA: Ballena Press.

External links 
Mutsun Dictionary
 
Mutsun Language Talking phrasebook archived
Amah-Mutsun Tribe Website 
Indian Canyon - recognized "Indian Country" in Hollister
Mutsun language overview at the Survey of California and Other Indian Languages

Ohlone languages
Extinct languages of North America
History of San Benito County, California